USS Olympia may refer to:

 is a protected cruiser in active service from 1895 to 1922, most notably in the Spanish–American War, and presently a museum ship in Philadelphia
 is a Los Angeles-class nuclear attack submarine commissioned in 1984 and currently not in service

See also

United States Navy ship names